Rudolf Popler (26 May 1899 – 16 October 1932) was a Czech equestrian. He competed at the 1924 Summer Olympics and the 1928 Summer Olympics.

References

External links
 

1899 births
1932 deaths
Czech male equestrians
Olympic equestrians of Czechoslovakia
Equestrians at the 1924 Summer Olympics
Equestrians at the 1928 Summer Olympics
People from Vysoké Mýto
Sportspeople from the Pardubice Region